Julia Schlaepfer (born March 3, 1995) is an American actress, best known for playing Alexandra on the Paramount+ television series 1923.

Filmography

Television

Film

References

External links
 
 
 

1995 births
Living people
21st-century American actresses
American film actresses